This was the inaugural edition of the singles competition of the 2022 Forlì Open tennis tournament.

Lorenzo Musetti won the title after defeating Francesco Passaro 2–6, 6–3, 6–2 in the final.

Seeds

Draw

Finals

Top half

Bottom half

External links
Main draw
Qualifying draw

Forlì Open - 1
2022 Singles